Carol S. Remond is a journalist for Dow Jones Newswires, a subsidiary of Dow Jones & Company, publisher of The Wall Street Journal.

Career
In 2005, she won the Gerald Loeb Award in the News Services Online Content category for her coverage of "Exposing Small-Cap Fraud." Her reporting on the small-cap stocks helped expose three companies that used unscrupulous means to promote their stocks. The work led to SEC investigations of these companies.

Remond has a bachelor's degree in economics from the University of Dijon (France) and a master's degree in political science from Miami University at Oxford, Ohio.

References

Year of birth missing (living people)
Living people
The Wall Street Journal people
American women journalists
Miami University alumni
Gerald Loeb Award winners for News Service, Online, and Blogging
21st-century American women